"He Left a Lot to Be Desired" is a song written by Larry Boone and Rick Bowles, and recorded by American country music group Ricochet.  It was released in April 1997 as the first single from the album Blink of an Eye.  The song reached number 18 on the Billboard Hot Country Singles & Tracks chart.

Chart performance
"He Left a Lot to Be Desired" debuted at number 63 on the U.S. Billboard Hot Country Singles & Tracks for the week of May 3, 1997.

References

1997 singles
1997 songs
Ricochet (band) songs
Songs written by Larry Boone
Songs written by Rick Bowles
Song recordings produced by Ron Chancey
Columbia Records singles